Neocollyris lugubris is a species of ground beetle in the genus Neocollyris in the family Carabidae. It was described by Vander Linden in 1829.

References

Lugubris, Neocollyris
Beetles described in 1829
Taxa named by Pierre Léonard Vander Linden